Hiram Monserrate (born July 12, 1967) is an American politician and convicted felon from the State of New York. A Democrat, Monserrate represented New York's 13th State Senate District in Queens from January 1, 2009 until February 9, 2010, when he was expelled from office following a misdemeanor conviction for assaulting his then-girlfriend. He later served time in prison following a plea of guilty to federal corruption charges. Monserrate is also a former Marine, a former New York City police officer, and a former member of the New York City Council.

Political career (2002–present)

New York City Council
Monserrate served on the New York City Council from 2002 to 2008, representing District 21 in Queens.

In June 2003, Mayor Michael Bloomberg announced an executive order allowing city employees to report illegal immigrants to federal authorities. Monserrate, then chairing the Council's Black, Latino and Asian Caucus, argued that this order would worsen relations between immigrant communities and the police. He responded by sponsoring a bill entitled "Access Without Fear", which would have forbidden city officials from revealing such information except as required by law. He joined director Stephen Frears in publicizing the immigration film Dirty Pretty Things to raise awareness of the issue.

In late 2008, Monserrate opposed Mayor Bloomberg's planned use of eminent domain in the $4 billion Willets Point Redevelopment project in Queens. The long-term project aimed to clear the  industrial area, clear up pollution, and develop a hotel and convention center. However, it was initially opposed by a majority of the existing business owners. Monserrate changed his mind and supported the development after being assured that one-third of the housing would be "affordable" and that the city would offer businesses an opportunity to relocate. He told reporters the compromise showed that government "can be fair and still do good economic development".

Scientology controversy
Monserrate supported the New York Rescue Workers Detoxification Project, a project co-founded by Tom Cruise to deliver the so-called Purification Rundown (an unproven "detoxification" procedure created by L. Ron Hubbard as part of Scientology) to rescue workers affected by the September 11 attacks. Monserrate went through the program himself, and drafted official proclamations honoring both Cruise and Hubbard. He also attended a fund-raising dinner in New York for the project, as well as an event at the Scientology Celebrity Centre in Los Angeles. Monserrate dismissed medical authorities' criticism of the Purification Rundown, saying, "This is the same type of thing they said about chiropractors twenty years ago."

New York State Senate
In 2006, Monserrate ran for New York State Senate against fellow Democrat John Sabini, a 16-year incumbent. Monserrate came within 200 votes of pulling off an upset in one of the closest races in Queens.

In 2008, he again ran for the State Senate with the support of organized labor. Sabini withdrew from the race following his appointment to chair the New York State Racing and Wagering Board. Monserrate then ran unopposed and on November 4, 2008, was elected the New York State Senator for the 13th district.

On June 8, 2009, Monserrate and Pedro Espada (D-Bronx) joined Senate Republicans in an attempted parliamentary coup for the purpose of shifting control of the Senate to the Republicans; Monserrate, Espada, and all 30 Senate Republicans voted, 32-30, to replace Senate Majority Leader Malcolm Smith with then-Senate Republican Leader Dean Skelos and install Espada as Temporary President of the Senate. This action resulted in the 2009 New York State Senate leadership crisis. A week later, Senate Democrats appointed Senator John Sampson as their leader. On the same day, Monserrate rejoined the Democratic caucus, leaving the Senate in a 31-31 deadlock. With the office of Lieutenant Governor vacant due to Eliot Spitzer's resignation, the tie could not be resolved, and the resulting legislative deadlock continued until July 9, when Espada rejoined the Democrats.

On December 2, 2009, Monserrate voted against legislation allowing same-sex marriage, which failed to pass the Senate.

Expulsion from the New York State Senate
A bipartisan nine-member committee recommended disciplinary action against Monserrate following his 2009 misdemeanor assault conviction. If Monserrate had been convicted of the felony charges against him, he would have been automatically expelled from the Senate. Politicians of both parties at the national, state, and local level called for him to resign or be expelled from the State Senate.  The committee's report was released on January 14, 2010 and recommended that the full Senate expel or censure Monserrate.

On February 9, 2010, the Senate Senate voted to expel Monserrate. The vote was 53 to 8, with one senator not present.  In response, Monserrate sued the State Senate in federal court. Monserrate lost his case on the District Court level and in the Second Circuit Court of Appeals.

Post-Senate political career

2010 State Senate special election
The Queens Democratic Party withdrew its support for Monserrate's 2010 re-election bid on October 29, 2009. The party leadership supported Assemblyman Jose Peralta for the State Senate. Following Monserrate's expulsion from the Senate, Governor David Paterson called for a special election in the 13th Senate District to be held on March 16, 2010. Peralta won the special election, outpolling Monserrate 65 percent to 27 percent.

2010 State Assembly election
Monserrate filed petitions with the Board of Elections to be entered in the Democratic primary to fill the 39th Assembly District seat (Jackson Heights-Corona) vacated by Jose Peralta following his election to the State Senate. The Queens County Democratic Party endorsed community activist Francisco Moya for the seat.  On September 14, 2010, Moya defeated Monserrate in the Democratic primary, 2,711 votes to 1,358 votes.

2016 Democratic District Leader election
In June 2016, following his release from federal prison, Monserrate attempted his third political comeback by seeking the unpaid elected position of Democratic District Leader for the 35th District in Corona and East Elmhurst. Monserrate ran against Democratic incumbent and community volunteer George R. Dixon. Despite having struggled to meet court-ordered financial obligations, Monserrate opened a campaign office and hired paid staffers. On September 13, 2016, Monserrate lost his bid for district leader by 57 votes.

2017 New York City Council election
In 2017, Monserrate ran for New York City Council in District 21. He was defeated by Francisco Moya in the Democratic primary, 55%-44%.

2018 Democratic District Leader election
In 2018, Monserrate again sought a district leader post in Queens. On September 13, 2018, he prevailed.

2020 New York State Assembly candidacy
In November 2019, Monserrate filed to run for New York State Assembly in District 35 in 2020 against incumbent Assemblymember Jeffrion L. Aubry. Monserrate lost to Aubry in the Democratic primary, 65-35%.

2021 New York City Council election
In February 2021, the New York City Council passed a local law by a 44-1 vote, barring former lawmakers from running for municipal office if they have been convicted of corruption. The law was reportedly targeted at Monserrate, who had announced his intent to again run against Moya and other candidates in the Democratic primary for his former seat on the New York City Council and was collecting campaign donations. Monserrate filed his nominating petition signatures the following month, but was blocked from receiving matching campaign funds by the city's Campaign Finance Board and from appearing on the ballot by the New York City Board of Elections. Monserrate filed a federal lawsuit, claiming that the law did not bar him from receiving matching donations and contending that keeping him off the ballot was unconstitutional.

2022 New York State Assembly candidacy

Monserrate again filed to run for New York State Assembly in District 35 against incumbent Assemblymember Jeffrion L. Aubry. Monserrate lost to Aubry in the Democratic primary, 61-38%.

Legal problems

2008 assault charges

Arrest and investigation
Monserrate was arrested on December 19, 2008 and accused of slashing Karla Giraldo, his girlfriend, in the face with a broken drinking glass during an argument in his Jackson Heights apartment. He was arraigned the same day and pleaded not guilty to the charges of second-degree assault, a felony that carried a maximum sentence of seven years in prison, and fourth-degree criminal possession of a weapon.

Giraldo initially made statements to hospital staff and the police that led to Monserrate's arrest. However, Giraldo later changed her account to match that of Monserrate, stated that the cuts on her face near her left eye from a broken glass were an accident, and added that she was no longer cooperating with the investigation. Sources discussed evidence with the media, including video surveillance that supported the charges of assault and the attempt to cover it up.

Prosecution
On March 23, 2009, a Queens grand jury indicted Monserrate on three counts of felony assault on Giraldo and three counts of misdemeanor assault. Monserrate denied the charges, saying "Listen, the reality is that from the very beginning I have said this was an accident. My girlfriend said it's an accident. This is an accident and we look forward to the dismissal of all these charges based on the truth."

The case proceeded to trial, and Monserrate waived his right to a jury on September 18, 2009.  As his trial started, security camera footage from Monserrate's apartment building was entered into evidence and made public. The footage showed Giraldo girlfriend screaming and clutching at doorways as Monserrate forced her out of the building. Giraldo testified in Monserrate's defense.

Conviction and sentencing
On October 15, 2009, Monserrate was acquitted of the second-degree assault felony counts, but convicted on a third-degree assault misdemeanor count which carried a maximum sentence of one year in prison. On December 4, 2009, Monserrate was sentenced to three years' probation, 250 hours of community service, a $1,000 fine, and one year of domestic abuse counseling.  He sought to vacate an order of protection preventing him from contact with Giraldo, but it was not vacated.

In an appearance before the sentencing judge, William Erlbaum, on July 7, 2010, Monserrate again petitioned to have a court order prohibiting him from contact with Giraldo vacated. The petition was granted, and according to the New York Post, Monserrate and Giraldo kissed and held hands. The pair later ended their relationship.

2010 federal corruption charges
In October 2010, Monserrate was indicted on federal corruption charges which alleged that, as a sitting member of the City Council, he had used staff members of a nonprofit organization—the Latino Initiative for Better Resources and Empowerment—to perform tasks related to his unsuccessful 2006 State Senate campaign. In 2006 and 2007, then-Councilmember Monserrate allocated $300,000 in discretionary city funding to LIBRE, and the indictment charged that approximately one-third of that funding went toward paying LIBRE staff for their campaign-related work.  After the court proceeding, he was freed after posting a $500,000 bond, secured by a home belonging to his parents. Millions of dollars in so-called discretionary member items had been allocated by members of the City Council to non-profit groups with ties to the members.  The investigation of Monserrate was part of a broad federal investigation to determine if these funds had been used for the members' personal or political expenses.

Monserrate was assigned a court-appointed attorney. In May 2012, Monserrate pleaded guilty to charges of mail fraud and mail fraud conspiracy. In December 2012, he was sentenced to serve two years in prison.

In 2015, the U.S. Department of Probation informed Monserrate's judge that he had failed to make timely restitution payments.

Monserrate served 21 months in federal prison.

See also

List of New York Legislature members expelled or censured
Politics of New York (state)

References

External links

  (shortly after the previous link was added to this Wikipedia article, the New York Times and others noted this dormant site was still accepting comments, most of which were highly critical of Monserrate)
 Lou Dobbs Tonight Panel on illegal immigration, including Monserrate and his City Council colleague, Dennis Gallagher.
 Council Members Question Bloomberg 'Sweetheart Deal' With Developer. The New York Sun. April 26, 2005.
 Public Lives; A Political Bulldog Who Does a Mean Merengue. New York Times. September 25, 2003.
 NYCLU Legal Brief Challenging Monserrate Expulsion from  NY Senate

American people convicted of assault
Hispanic and Latino American state legislators in New York (state)
Democratic Party New York (state) state senators
New York City Council members
New York City Police Department officers
Queens College, City University of New York alumni
Living people
1967 births
Expelled New York State Senators
New York (state) politicians convicted of crimes
21st-century American politicians
21st-century American criminals
Criminals from New York (state)
American fraudsters
Prisoners and detainees of the United States federal government